Twigg Township is one of twelve townships in Hamilton County, Illinois, USA.  As of the 2010 census, its population was 132 and it contained 71 housing units.

Geography

Unincorporated towns
 Dale at 
 Olga at 
(This list is based on USGS data and may include former settlements.)

Cemeteries
The township contains these four cemeteries: Digby, Marys Chapel, Smith and Mt. Olive.

Demographics

School districts
 Hamilton County Community Unit School District 10

Political districts
 Illinois's 19th congressional district
 State House District 118
 State Senate District 59

References
 
 United States Census Bureau 2009 TIGER/Line Shapefiles
 United States National Atlas

External links
 [* Hamilton County Historical Society
 City-Data.com
 Illinois State Archives
 Township Officials of Illinois

Townships in Hamilton County, Illinois
Mount Vernon, Illinois micropolitan area
Townships in Illinois